Porterstown station is a proposed transport interchange intended for the Porterstown area of Dublin. As proposed, the project was intended to form an interchange between heavy rail services operated by Iarnród Éireann and light rail operations on the proposed Dublin Metro's Metro West line.

If built as proposed, the station would be located on the Maynooth Line and would have Commuter services operating to Mullingar and Navan, as well as DART services.

The Dublin Metro is a proposed light rail operation, with some designs for the station speculating that it would be built on an elevated section over the railway line adjacent to the Royal Canal near Luttrellstown Community College. The Metro West line was indefinitely postponed in late 2011, with no capital funding allocated. It was not included in the Transport Strategy For The Greater Dublin Area of 2016, and described as "halted completely" as of 2021.

References

Proposed railway stations in the Republic of Ireland